Gunda Niemann-Stirnemann (née Kleemann, born 7 September 1966) is a German former speed skater. She is a three-time Olympic gold medallist, winning the 3000 metres in 1992 and 1998 and the 5000 metres in 1992. She won a total of eight Olympic medals.

Personal life

Born as Gunda Kleemann in Sondershausen, Bezirk Erfurt, East Germany, she has lived in Erfurt for most of her life. She changed her name to Gunda Niemann after her marriage in 1991 to judoka Detlev Niemann. After their divorce in 1995, she kept the name Niemann. She then changed her name to Niemann-Stirnemann after marrying her long-time Swiss manager Oliver Stirnemann on 11 July 1997. The speed skating oval in Erfurt, the Gunda-Niemann-Stirnemann-Halle, was named after her. Before the German reunification in 1990, she skated for East Germany.

Career
Niemann-Stirnemann dominated women's speed skating for several years, especially on the longer distances. She has competed in four Olympics, from 1988 to 1998, and won eight Olympic medals (3 gold, 4 silver, and 1 bronze). In the nine years from 1991 to 1999, she won the World Allround Championships every year except 1994. She has a record number of 98 World Cup single distance victories and has won 19 overall World Cup titles. She was European Allround Champion 8 times. Over the course of her career, she set 18 world records. For her performances, she received the Oscar Mathisen Award three times: in 1995, 1996 and 1997.

Niemann-Stirnemann left speed skating in 2001 to give birth to a daughter, but later returned to competition. She planned to make one last comeback and participate in the 2006 Winter Olympics in Turin, but a lingering back injury – which she suffered from since the 2004–05 season – made her quit. At the end of October 2005, a few days before the German Championships, she announced her retirement.

Except for one day in March 1998, Niemann-Stirnemann was number one in the Adelskalender, the all-time allround speed skating ranking, from 24 January 1993, until 2 March 2001 – a total of 2,958 days. She skated in Olympic, World, World Cup, European and national championships to 215 medals, thereof 163 gold medals.

World records 
Over the course of her career, Niemann-Stirnemann skated 18 world records:

Note that the 10000 m was suspended as a world record event at the 1953 ISU Congress.

Personal records
To put these personal records in perspective, the last column (WR) lists the official world records on the dates that Niemann-Stirnemann skated her personal records.

Niemann-Stirnemann has an Adelskalender score of 160.167 points. Her highest ranking on the Adelskalender was the first place.

Biography 
 Gunda Niemann-Stirnemann: Ich Will. Traumkarriere mit Tränen und Triumphen (2000). Das Neue Berlin.

External links
Gunda Niemann-Stirnemann at SkateResults.com
Gunda Niemann-Stirnemann at SpeedSkatingNews (in German)
Gunda Niemann-Stirnemann's personal site  (in German)
Photos of Gunda Niemann-Stirnemann
Gunda Niemann-Stirnemann at Olympic.org

1966 births
Living people
People from Sondershausen
German female speed skaters
Speed skaters at the 1988 Winter Olympics
Speed skaters at the 1992 Winter Olympics
Speed skaters at the 1994 Winter Olympics
Speed skaters at the 1998 Winter Olympics
Olympic speed skaters of East Germany
Olympic speed skaters of Germany
Medalists at the 1992 Winter Olympics
Medalists at the 1994 Winter Olympics
Medalists at the 1998 Winter Olympics
Olympic medalists in speed skating
Olympic gold medalists for Germany
Olympic silver medalists for Germany
Olympic bronze medalists for Germany
World record setters in speed skating
Sportspeople from Thuringia
World Allround Speed Skating Championships medalists